Scott "Top Ten" Kempner (born February 6, 1954, Bronx, New York, US) is the American rhythm guitarist with The Dictators since they formed in 1974 (only leaving the band for a few years starting in 2002). He is also a founding member of The Del-Lords and later a member of The Brandos. He released a critically acclaimed solo album in 1992 called Tenement Angels.

Kempner contributed "Apache Tears" to the 2007 compilation album Song of America. He released his second solo album, Saving Grace, in July 2008 on 00:02:59 Records.

In the early 1990s, Dion DiMucci joined Kempner and Frank Funaro of the Del-Lords and Mike Mesaros of the Smithereens in a short-lived band called Little Kings. A live album was later released, but not widely circulated or promoted.

In Summer 2008, Variety said about Kempner: "If the world were a just and fair place, Scott Kempner would be stopped regularly by musicians and music fans thanking him for the effect the records he made with the Del-Lords and the Dictators had on their lives. Kempner's music is impossible to not like: He's the rare master at making three-chord rock 'n' roll - inspired by the 1950s and '60s - sound fresh and vital, simultaneously urban and twangy, heartfelt, political and personal."

A Del-Lords reunion album and tour was done in 2013, and Kempner sang and played guitar on the Carla Olson album Have Harmony Will Travel, performing Little Steven's "All I Needed Was You".

References

External links
 
 
  2:59 Label's artist profile

1954 births
Living people
People from the Bronx
The Del-Lords members
Songwriters from New York (state)
Rhythm guitarists
Guitarists from New York (state)
20th-century American guitarists
The Dictators members
The Brandos members